Edna is an unincorporated community in Choctaw County, Alabama, United States.

History
A post office operated under the name Edna from 1910 to 1959.

The Pelham United Methodist Church, located in Edna, is listed on the Alabama Register of Landmarks and Heritage.

References

Unincorporated communities in Choctaw County, Alabama
Unincorporated communities in Alabama